Arthur Maranda (16 May 1887 – 25 February 1946) was a Canadian athlete. He competed in three events at the 1912 Summer Olympics.

References

1887 births
1946 deaths
Athletes (track and field) at the 1912 Summer Olympics
Canadian male long jumpers
Canadian male triple jumpers
Olympic track and field athletes of Canada
Athletes from Montreal